SSR may refer to:

Businesses, entertainment and products
 Solid State Records, a Christian record label
 Chevrolet SSR, a Chevrolet small truck
 Disney's Saratoga Springs Resort & Spa
  Small Screen Rendering, a technology part of Opera Mini
 Sonic and the Secret Rings, a 2006 video game
 Sirius Satellite Radio, a satellite radio service operating in North America
 Strategic Scientific Reserve, a fictional organization in Marvel Comics and precursor to the fictional organization S.H.I.E.L.D.

Geographical locations
 Soviet Socialist Republic, see Republics of the Soviet Union
 Slovak Soviet Republic (1919), a very short-lived communist state in south and eastern Slovakia
 Slovak Socialist Republic, the official name of Slovakia from 1969 to 1990
Second Spanish Republic

Railways
 Southern Shorthaul Railroad, an Australian provider of motive power hauling trains in New South Wales and Victoria
 Southern Suburbs Railway, a New MetroRail project in Perth, Western Australia
 Springfield Street Railway, a former interurban street railway in Springfield, Massachusetts
 Strategic steam reserve, a collection of steam locomotives retained for use in a national emergency
 Sub-surface Railways, cut-and-cover railway lines forming part of the London Underground; also called Sub-surface Lines

Science and technology
 Scalable Sample Rate, used in MPEG-4 Part 3 and MPEG-2 Part 7
 Scalable Source Routing, a routing algorithm for unstructured networks
 Screen Space Reflections used in the computer graphics to compute approximate mirror reflections
 Secondary surveillance radar, a radar system used in air traffic control 
 Simple Sequence Repeat, repeating sequences of 2-6 base pairs of DNA
 Site-specific recombination, a type of genetic recombination in which DNA strand exchange takes place between segments possessing only a limited degree of sequence homology
 Slope stability radar, the application for the monitoring of slope stability at open-cut mines
 Solid-state relay, an electronic switching device in which a small control signal controls a larger load current or voltage
 Sources, sinks and reservoirs, for greenhouse gases
 Stable salt reactor, a proposed low-cost nuclear reactor design
 Sum of squared residuals
 Sum of squares due to regression
 Server-side rendering, using a web server to deliver a customized HTML file for a user (client)
 State-space representation, a particular type of a mathematical model of a physical system, used in control engineering and in satellite navigation

People 
 S. S. Rajamouli (born 1973), Indian film director
 S. S. Rajendran (1928-2014), Indian actor
 Sushant Singh Rajput (1986-2020), Indian actor
 Singeetam Srinivasa Rao (born 1931), Indian film director

Other uses
 Swiss Broadcasting Corporation (SRG SSR)
 Sainik School, Rewa, a senior secondary school in India
 Security sector reform, a process to amend a security sector towards good governance
 The South Saskatchewan Regiment, a Canadian infantry regiment
 Special Support and Reconnaissance Company, a Danish military unit
 The Structure of Scientific Revolutions, a 1962 book by Thomas Kuhn
 The obsolete United States Navy hull classification symbol for a diesel-electric radar picket submarine
 Sustained silent reading, a form of school-based recreational reading
 Self Supporting Run-flat tires, a type of run-flat tire
 Svenska Scoutrådet, the national Scouting and Guiding federation of Sweden
 In air travel passenger name records, a Special Service Request
Same-sex relationship
 Short-sale restriction, a modified uptick rule instituted by the U.S. Securities and Exchange Commission (SEC) in 2010
Somali State Resistance, a rebel group in Ethiopia